Blake Debassige was a Native Canadian artist of the M'Chigeeng First Nation, born at West Bay on Manitoulin Island in Ontario on June 22, 1956 passed June 13 2022. A leading member of the "second generation" of Ojibwa artists influenced by Norval Morrisseau, Debassige has broadened the stylistic and thematic range of this group. Debassige's paintings and graphics frequently investigate traditional Anishabek teachings about the nature of cosmic order, the cycles of the seasons, the interdependence of animal, plant and human life and the common principles at work in the world's great spiritual systems. He frequently relates these themes to highly contemporary problems such as the destruction of the environment, the alienation of native youth and family dysfunction.

Debassige married the Cree painter Shirley CheeChoo in 1978.

Solo exhibitions

 Debosegai, curated and toured by the Thunder Bay Art Gallery, July 12-September 8, 1985

Group exhibitions

 The art of the Anishnawbek : three perspectives: exhibition held at the Royal Ontario Museum, 9 March 1996-Spring 1997
Political landscapes # two:sacred and secular sites : an exhibition of work by thirteen artists from two communities, co-curated by Debassige and Stephen Hogbin and hosted at the Tom Thomson Memorial Art Gallery, August 23-September 22, 1991 and the Ojibway Cultural Foundation and Kasheese Studio, West Bay, Manitoulin Island, Sept. 27-Oct. 20, 1991 
Woodlands: Contemporary Art of the Anishnabe, curated by the Thunder Bay Art Gallery July 7-September 3, 1989
 Manitoulin Island: The Third Layer, curated by the Thunder Bay Art Gallery April 3-May 24, 1987 
 Last Camp, First Song: Indian Art from the Royal Ontario Museum, curated by the Thunder Bay Art Gallery, June 15-July 31, 1983
Anishnabe mee-kun : a circulating exhibition of art by Anishnabe artists of the Manitoulin Island area. Exhibition held at the Ojibwe Cultural Foundation, West Bay, Manitoulin Island, Sept. 15-Oct. 20, 1980

Collections 

 McMichael Canadian Art Collection 
 Ojibwe Cultural Foundation, Manitoulin Island

References

External links
 Blake Debassige - Canadian Heritage Information Network 
Blake Debassige - Canadian Encyclopedia entry

 

21st-century Canadian painters
Canadian male painters
Ojibwe people
First Nations painters
Artists from Ontario
1956 births
Living people
21st-century Canadian male artists